Aldercar and Langley Mill is a civil parish in the Amber Valley district of Derbyshire, England.  It includes the villages of Aldercar and Langley Mill, along with the hamlets of Stoneyford and Woodlinkin. The population of the civil parish taken at the 2011 Census was 5,405.

See also
Listed buildings in Aldercar and Langley Mill

References

External links
The Bridge Centre (The Langley Mill and Aldercar Community Resource Centre)
Heanor and District Local History Society - with information over several pages on the history of both Langley Mill and Aldercar
Aldercar and Langley Mill Parish Council
Langley Mill Heritage Group - dedicated to preserving the history and development of Langley Mill

Civil parishes in Derbyshire
Geography of Amber Valley